Brigadier-General John Tyson Wigan,  (31 July 1877 – 23 November 1952) was a senior British Army officer and later a Conservative Party politician.  He served with the Desert Mounted Corps during World War I, and was wounded in action three times during campaigning at the Battle of Gallipoli and during the Sinai and Palestine Campaign. He had previously been badly wounded in the Second Boer War.

Following his retirement from the army post-war, Wigan became a Member of Parliament (MP) for three years.

Life
John Wigan was born in July 1877 in West Hartlepool and educated at Rugby School before joining the British Army in May 1897 as a second lieutenant with the 13th Hussars. He was promoted to the rank of lieutenant on 8 March 1899, and later that year was deployed to South Africa for service in the Second Boer War. While in South Africa he was severely wounded during reconnaissance near Sundays River (in Cape Colony) in March 1900. He stayed in South Africa throughout the war, and was promoted to the rank of captain on 26 March 1902. Following the end of hostilities, he left South Africa with other men of his regiment on the SS City of Vienna, which arrived at Southampton in October 1902. In 1909, Wigan retired from the regular army and transferred to the Territorial Army with the Berkshire Yeomanry. This force was activated at the outbreak of World War I and sent to the Mediterranean.

Wigan was seriously wounded in 1915 during the Battle of Gallipoli while in command of the Berkshire Yeomanry, and was awarded the Distinguished Service Order (DSO) the following year in acknowledgement of his service. The Berkshire Yeomanry moved to Egypt in 1916 and in April 1917 Wigan was again wounded at the Second Battle of Gaza. In July 1917, Wigan was advanced to command the 7th Mounted Brigade and in November 1917 this force was deployed in the Third Battle of Gaza at which Wigan was wounded for a fourth time in an attack on Turkish trenchlines.  On 7 April 1918, he was appointed to command of the 22nd Mounted Brigade (later redesignated 12th Cavalry Brigade) in 4th Cavalry Division, a command he held until the end of the war.

In 1918 Wigan was made a Companion of the Order of St Michael and St George (CMG) in recognition of his service and in 1919 a Companion of the Order of the Bath (CB). At the end of the war, the yeomanry was decommissioned and Wigan entered politics as MP for Abingdon. He was on the governing body of Abingdon School from 1918 to 1921.

In 1921 Wigan gave up his seat and retired, later serving as High Sheriff of Essex in 1930. Wigan died in Cuckfield, West Sussex in November 1952.

References

Bibliography

External links 
 

1872 births
1952 deaths
People educated at Rugby School
13th Hussars officers
Conservative Party (UK) MPs for English constituencies
UK MPs 1918–1922
British Army personnel of the Second Boer War
British Army cavalry generals of World War I
Berkshire Yeomanry officers
Companions of the Order of the Bath
Companions of the Order of St Michael and St George
Companions of the Distinguished Service Order
Deputy Lieutenants of Essex
High Sheriffs of Essex
People from West Hartlepool
Governors of Abingdon School
British Army brigadiers
Military personnel from County Durham